The Autorité régionale de transport métropolitain (ARTM) is an umbrella organization that manages and integrates road transport and public transport in Greater Montreal in Quebec, Canada. The organization was created by the Government of Quebec on June 1, 2017, replacing the former planning mandate of the Agence métropolitaine de transport (AMT). It has assumed other key initiatives including Opus card operation and multiple other projects supporting transit.

History
In 2017, the ATM was abolished and replaced by two newly created organizations, the ARTM and the Réseau de transport métropolitain (RTM). Its planning mandate went to the ARTM while the operation of the various commuter rail lines across the Greater Montreal became the responsibility of the RTM. Also known as Exo, the latter also acquired oversight of the public transport agencies of Montreal, Laval, and Longueuil.

Organization
The ARTM consists of six appointed chair members from the Montreal Metropolitan Community council and six transit experts appointed by Transports Québec, the provincial transportation authority.

Park and ride 

The ARTM also is responsible for all Park and ride lots in the Greater Montreal region. It runs 61 park-and-ride lots, many that are connected to either metropolitan bus terminuses, STM Metro stations, or Exo commuter rail stations.

In addition, the agency also organizes carpooling, offering unloading spaces near public transit services in several of its park-and-ride lots, which allow for transfers to the bus, Metro or commuter train.

Future projects 

The ARTM has focus on several transit projects for the next ten years. The agency will submit a new ten year Transit Expansion plan to the Quebec Government in the Fall of 2018.

 Metro extensions: Extending the Orange, Yellow and Blue lines. A project office is currently studying extensions of the Orange line to the suburb of Laval, passing through the Montréal borough of Saint-Laurent, and the Yellow line farther into Longueuil.
 Electrification of its commuter rail lines. In the past, only the Deux-Montagnes line ran on electricity.
 A bus rapid transit (BRT) system on Pie-IX Boulevard. The BRT will include two dedicated bus lanes in the middle of Pie-IX Boulevard from Laval to Montréal and include 21 stations and three park-and-ride lots.
 Build maintenance centres in Lachine and Pointe-Saint-Charles. The two sites will allow the RTM to maintain and store (between peak hours) its train cars and locomotives. The Lachine site will accommodate rolling stock running on Canadian Pacific tracks and the Pointe-Saint-Charles site will accommodate trains running on Canadian National tracks, as well as cars for the Réseau express métropolitain network.
 Increasing frequency on other commuter rail lines by the way of investments.

References

Exo (public transit)
Transport in Montreal